Caloptilia acericolella is a moth of the family Gracillariidae. It is known from Kazakhstan.

The larvae feed on Acer semenovii. They probably mine the leaves of their host plant.

References

acericolella
Moths described in 1981
Moths of Asia